The BQM-1BR was a Brazilian unmanned aerial vehicle designed and built locally by Companhia Brasileira de Tratores for several kinds of sensing roles.

Design and development
The BQM-1 BR was the first remotely controlled vehicle built in Brazil by the Companhia Brasileira de Tratores (CBT) in partnership with the Department of Aerospace Science and Technology. It was developed for military and civilian use, with versions for reconnaissance, attack, and crop-dusting. The wings had 3° dihedral. 4° of incidence, and were swept 33° over most of the span, increasing to 55" the root. Conventional semi-monocoque fuselage, circular root cross-section. Fixed incidence caudal plane cantilever, with 5°.dihedral and 30° leading edge sweep. It used a turbojet engine produced nationally by CBT, mounted in a nacelle on top of the rear fuselage at the base of the fin.

A first batch of 20 units of this model were planned by the Brazilian Air Force. However, due to economic and political factors in Brazil, the project was abandoned.

Specifications

Notes

References

External links
Lexicar Brasil
CTA website

Aircraft first flown in 1983
Abandoned military aircraft projects of Brazil
Unmanned aerial vehicles of Brazil
Unmanned military aircraft of Brazil
1980s Brazilian experimental aircraft
1980s Brazilian military aircraft